Mechanical Resonance is the debut studio album by the American hard rock band Tesla. It was released on December 8, 1986, by Geffen Records. 

The album peaked at No. 32 on the Billboard 200 on April 3, 1987,  and was certified platinum by the RIAA on October 5, 1989.

Track listing

Personnel
Band members
 Jeff Keith – lead vocals
 Frank Hannon – acoustic & electric guitars, keyboards, mandolin, backing vocals
 Tommy Skeoch – acoustic & electric guitars, backing vocals
 Brian Wheat – bass, backing vocals
 Troy Luccketta – drums, percussion

Production
 Steve Thompson – producer
 Michael Barbiero – producer, engineer 
 Michael Beyer – engineer and mixing on "Little Suzi" acoustic intro
 George Marino – mastering at Sterling Sound, New York

Charts

Weekly charts

Year-end charts

Singles

Certifications

Accolades

See also
List of glam metal albums and songs

References

1986 debut albums
Tesla (band) albums
Geffen Records albums